Astragalus missouriensis is a species of flowering plant in the legume family known by the common name Missouri milkvetch. It is native to central North America, where it is common and widespread.

References

External links

USDA Plants Profile
The Nature Conservancy.

missouriensis
Plants described in 1818